Rock Wars is a Canadian television variety series, which aired in 1985 on CBC Television. A national "battle of the bands" competition, the series featured unsigned musical groups competing in a series of regional concerts held in various cities across Canada, with the winner of each episode advancing to another round of competition until the ultimate winner was named at a final concert staged in Vancouver, British Columbia.

Hosted by Brad Giffen, the program aired on Friday nights as a companion to the network's music video series Good Rockin' Tonite. Judges over the course of the series included Keith Sharp of Music Express, Samantha Taylor of CBC's Video Hits and CFNY-FM program director David Marsden.

The series was won by Tchukon, a funk and rhythm and blues band from Montreal, Quebec, over finalists Eye Eye, HB Concept and Peter Mann and the Lonely. Other competitors over the course of the series included Monuments Galore, The Instructions, The Rage, The Stilettos, Eight Seconds, The Waiting, Haywire, Mad Shadows, Steps Around the House, Apple Viper, Zlatko and The Micah Barnes Band.

Tchukon later went on to win Best Vocal Group in the 1986 edition of the American series Star Search.

References

1985 Canadian television series debuts
1985 Canadian television series endings
1980s Canadian music television series
1980s Canadian reality television series
Television shows filmed in Vancouver
CBC Television original programming
Canadian late-night television programming